AUU Inter Bangkok Football Club (Thai สโมสรฟุตบอลเอยูยู อินเตอร์ แบงค็อก), is a Thai semi professional football club based in Pathum Thani. The club was founded in 2015 as Bangkok University Deffo. The club is currently playing in the Thai League 3 Bangkok metropolitan region.

History
The club was established in 2015 as Bangkok University Deffo Football Club.

In 2018, the club had renamed to Deffo Football Club competed in Thai League 3.

In 2019, after relegated to Thai League 4 the club had token over and renamed to Rangsit United Football Club.

In 2020, the club was taken over and renamed to Inter Bangkok Football Club.

Stadium and locations

Season by season record

P = Played
W = Games won
D = Games drawn
L = Games lost
F = Goals for
A = Goals against
Pts = Points
Pos = Final position

QR1 = First Qualifying Round
QR2 = Second Qualifying Round
R1 = Round 1
R2 = Round 2
R3 = Round 3
R4 = Round 4

R5 = Round 5
R6 = Round 6
QF = Quarter-finals
SF = Semi-finals
RU = Runners-up
W = Winners

Players

Current squad

References

External links
 Club's info from Thai League official website
 

Association football clubs established in 2011
Football clubs in Thailand
Pathum Thani province
2011 establishments in Thailand